Eric S. Lipton (born August 13, 1965) is a reporter at The New York Times based in the Washington Bureau. He has been a working journalist for three decades, with stints at The Washington Post and the Hartford Courant, and he is also the co-author of a history of the World Trade Center.

Lipton joined The Times in 1999, covering the final years of the administration of New York Mayor Rudolph W. Giuliani, as well as the 2001 terror attacks. Since 2004, he has been based in the Washington bureau of The New York Times, where he is an investigative reporter who now writes about the Trump administration, as well as lobbying and corporate agendas in Congress. His previous assignments included the Department of Homeland Security and the Transportation Security Administration, as well as the aftermath of Hurricane Katrina.

Lipton has won or participated in three Pulitzer Prizes, among numerous other journalism awards.

Career and awards
Prior to working for The New York Times, he spent five years each at The Washington Post, the Hartford Courant, and the first two years of his newspaper career at the Valley News in Lebanon, New Hampshire. Lipton is a 1987 graduate of the University of Vermont where he received a BA in philosophy and history as well as working at The Vermont Cynic.

In 2018, he and a group of other New York Times reporters won the John B. Oakes Award for Environmental Reporting from Columbia University for a series of stories about the Trump administration's effort to rollback environmental protections.

In 2017, he was part of a team of 11 reporters at The Times awarded the Pulitzer Prize for International Reporting for its coverage on Russia’s covert projection of power, including the story examining Russian interference in the 2016 presidential election.

In 2015, he won the Pulitzer Prize for Investigative Journalism for a series of stories about lobbying of state attorneys general and Congress. That series of stories also was awarded the 2015 prize for large circulation newspapers by Investigative Reporters and Editors. And he was among a group of reporters that earned the 2015 Gerald Loeb Award for Beat Reporting.

One of the three stories in the series about state attorneys general focused on Scott Pruitt, then the Attorney General of Oklahoma, detailing for the first time the secretive alliance Pruitt had with oil and gas companies and other energy producers. These companies were sending tens of millions of dollars to the Republican Attorneys General Association that Pruitt helped run at the same time as Pruitt was helping the companies fight Obama-era environmental regulations, by suing to block these rules in federal court at least 14 times. Lipton found that Pruitt had taken draft letters written by the energy companies, put them on his state government stationary and sent them in to officials in Washington. When Pruitt was later nominated to serve as the head of the Environmental Protection Agency under President Trump, this story became a central focus of his confirmation hearing.

In 1992, he won a Pulitzer Prize in Explanatory Journalism, at the age of 26, for a series of stories he co-authored at the Hartford Courant on the Hubble Space Telescope with Robert S. Capers. The stories examined the team of scientists who built the main mirror of the Hubble Space Telescope, considered one of the most complex scientific devices at the time of its launch. Facing financial pressures and other challenges, the team built a misshapen main mirror for the space telescope, a flaw that was ultimately corrected but caused embarrassment and questions about the status of United States space science.

In 2021, stories Lipton and other reporters from The New York Times wrote over the prior year about "how the Trump administration consistently failed to respond properly or adequately to the coronavirus threat, including downplaying its seriousness," were named as a Pulitzer Prize finalist in National Reporting.

Lipton was also a finalist in 1999 for the Livingston Award for young journalists while working as a reporter at The Washington Post, for a series of stories examining the trash industry in New York City, which then shipped most of its waste via truck to landfills in Virginia. In 2008, he was the recipient of an honorary degree from the University of Vermont.

World Trade Center coverage 
Lipton spent months after the September 2001 attacks covering the aftermath of the attacks on New York, writing a series of stories for The New York Times and its "Nation Challenged" section about the efforts to recover and identify human remains from the site and to clear the World Trade Center site of the debris left after the attack. Those stories, co-written with James Glanz of The New York Times, were part of a package that was a finalist for the Pulitzer Prize in 2002.

A story in The New York Times Magazine he co-wrote with James Glanz, which appeared on the first anniversary of the attacks, examined the history of the trade center towers. That story was the basis for a book he would co-author with James Glanz, published in 2003, City in the Sky, the Rise and Fall of the World Trade Center, which examined the conception, design, construction, life and ultimate destruction of the twin towers, tracing the story back to the 1950s when the project was first proposed by David Rockefeller. A second story, titled "Fighting to Live as the Towers Died", examined the fate of the unlucky individuals who were stuck above the point of impact in the two towers after the planes hit, a piece based on hundreds of hours or work collecting random emails, text messages and recollections of phone calls with those victims, all of which were assembled into a single narrative. That story formed the basis of a 2004 book called 102 Minutes: The Untold Story of the Fight to Survive Inside the Twin Towers, written by Jim Dwyer and Kevin Flynn, who were co-authors on the original New York Times story.

Archival materials from the Lipton and Glanz research effort—the most comprehensive history ever written about the World Trade Center—are now maintained at the New York Public Library. The materials are separated into five chronological categories: Conception (1945-1970), Construction (1966-1973), Life in the Towers (1972-2001), 9/11, and Post 9/11 (2001-2003) The research was also featured in an episode of the documentary series American Experience, "New York: The Center of the World".

Homeland Security 
Lipton was among the first reporters to be assigned to cover the Department of Homeland Security full-time. He started shortly after it was created, writing stories that examined the challenges associated with the largest change in federal bureaucracy since Harry S. Truman was president, and chronicling the agency's struggle as it spent billions of dollars on flawed airport security screening equipment and ships for the Coast Guard. His assignment ended up taking him to disaster zones around the world, including weeks spend in Mississippi and Louisiana in 2005 in the aftermath of Hurricane Katrina, examining flaws in the government response and waste and fraud in hurricane aid. He was also sent in December 2004 to Banda Aceh, along with a team of reporters from The New York Times, to cover the earthquake and tsunami there that killed more than 150,000.

Trump coverage 
Lipton has been part of a collection of reporters at The Times who have examined the business operations of The Trump Organization as Donald J. Trump moved to the White House. He has detailed the potential for conflicts of interest, including Trump Hotel in Washington D.C. and Trump operations in the Philippines, Turkey, India, Brazil, Indonesia, Dubai, Vancouver, and other stops. He also looked at how the Trump family took steps to attempt to address some of the issues covered in these stories. Lipton has also written pieces about the arrival within the Trump administration of former lobbyists, corporate lawyers and corporate executives, like Carl Icahn, who have taken up issues with their new powers that may benefit their holdings or past business partners.
During the Trump administration, Lipton's coverage focused on environmental consequences of regulatory rollbacks made at the Environmental Protection Agency and the Interior Department and how tax cuts that President Trump championed benefitted some of his wealthy friends. He also spent much of 2020 covering the coronavirus outbreak, working with teams of other reporters examining the reasons behind the flawed federal response by the White House and the Centers for Disease Control and Prevention.

His work has been featured in a number of other documentary films, including The Falling Man, by Harry Singer, and War on Whistleblowers: Free Press and the National Security State, a 2013 film examining government whistleblowers. He also served as a consultant to the 2020 documentary film Totally Under Control, which examined the Trump administration response to the coronavirus pandemic.

Personal life

Lipton lives in Washington, D.C. with his wife, Elham Dehbozorgi.

References

Further reading 
 NYPL Lipton World Trade Center collection
 Interview on Vermont Public Radio

External links
 
 
 
 https://www.nytimes.com/2017/04/10/insider/pulitzer-winners.html

1960s births
Living people
Male journalists
Pulitzer Prize for Explanatory Journalism winners
University of Vermont alumni
The Washington Post people
The New York Times writers
Hartford Courant people
Germantown Academy alumni
Pulitzer Prize for Investigative Reporting winners
Gerald Loeb Award winners for Deadline and Beat Reporting